Ustad Iqbal Hussain Khan Bandanawazi Qawwal (1942-2010)  was a Sufi qawwal of  Hyderabad India. He had worked as a top artist in All India Radio Akashwani for many years. His Qawwali group is known as Bandanawazi Qawwal he learned Indian classical music from his father Ustad Qurban Hussain Khan.

Family background
Ustad Iqbal Hussain Khan belongs to Gwalior Gharana and his father Ustad Qurban Hussain Khan. He was well-versed in several forms of classical singing. He has four daughters and one son Ateeq Hussain Khan Bandanawazi who has learnt Qawwali since childhood from his father and resembles his voice and style. Ateeq Hussain Khan Qawwal is currently carrying the legacy of his father and heading the Sufi qawwali group Bandanawazi Qawwal.

Achievements
He received Sangeet Prabhakar Award From Chief Minister of Andhra Pradesh Y.S.Rajasekhara Reddy. He also received Life Time Achievement Award From Urdu Academy and Andhra Pradesh tourism department. in 2001 he was received bhagya lakshmi puraskar from Telugu academy. 1982 his was also received Sahitya Kala Parishad  Samman from Government of Delhi.he has performed at Rashtrapati Bhavan in 1994 in front of then president of India honorable Shankar Dayal Sharma.

References

External links
 Bandanawazi Qawwal website

1942 births
2010 deaths
Scholars from Hyderabad, India
Indian Sufis